The Sikorsky XH-39 (manufacturer designation S-59),  developed by Sikorsky Aircraft in 1954, was the U.S. Army's first turbine-powered helicopter. It was fast and innovative, but ultimately rejected by the United States Army in favor of the Bell UH-1 Iroquois.

Design and development

The four-seat XH-39 was powered by one Continental CAE XT51-T-3 400 shp (298 kW) turboshaft engine, a license-built development of the Turbomeca Artouste. It was developed from a previous Sikorsky model, the H-18 (company model S-52), and had the same layout. It differed in using retractable landing gear, modified tail rotor, and four-blade main rotor. In the end, the U.S. Army selected the Bell XH-40, prototype of the UH-1 Huey. Two YH-18As were modified into XH-39s; one for flight testing and the other for static test.

On 26 August 1954, the XH-39 set a world helicopter speed record of 156.005 mph (251 km/h) over a three kilometer closed course at Bradley Field (now Bradley International Airport) in Windsor Locks, Connecticut. The same year, on October 17, 1954, it set an unofficial world helicopter altitude record of 24,500 ft (7,474 m) at Bridgeport, Connecticut.

In addition to the two XH-39s, one S-59, serial number 52004, registration number N74150, was produced for use for company demonstration flights. It has been restored and is now on display at the New England Air Museum, Windsor Locks, Connecticut.

Variants

XH-39
Former YH-18A modified for static testing, not flown and later modified back to YH-18A standard.
XH-39A
Former YH-18A modified for flight testing.

Specifications (XH-39)

See also

References

Notes

Bibliography

 Harding, Stephen. U.S. Army Aircraft Since 1947. Shrewsbury, England: Airlife, 1990. .
 Polmar, Norman and Floyd D. Kennedy, Jr. Military Helicopters of the World: Military Rotary-wing Aircraft Since 1917.. Annapolis, Maryland: Naval Institute Press, 1981. .

External links

 "Sikorsky Model XH-39 (S-59)." at Global Security (accessed 12 May 2008)

United States military helicopters
1950s United States military utility aircraft
H-039
1950s United States helicopters
Single-turbine helicopters
Aircraft first flown in 1954